"Hounds of Love" is a song written, produced and performed by English art rock singer Kate Bush. It is the title track and the third single released from her No. 1 studio album Hounds of Love. The single was released on 24 February 1986, and reached No. 18 in the UK Singles Chart.

Overview
The song is about being afraid to fall in love; in the song this feeling is compared to being chased by a pack of hounds.

The versions worldwide differ slightly: the US single mix included an additional chorus just after the second chorus. The words "it's in the trees, it's coming!" heard at the beginning of the track are sampled from the British 1957 horror film Night of the Demon and are mouthed by an actor from the film, Reginald Beckwith, who plays a medium channelling a character played by Maurice Denham, who provides the voice.

In October 2004, Q magazine placed this song at No. 21 in its list of the 50 greatest British songs of all time.

The song was performed live for the first time as part of the 2014 Before the Dawn residency, in which the lyrics were slightly altered.

English post-punk band the Futureheads covered the song in 2005, scoring a UK Top 10 hit with it. Faroese singer Eivør also covered the song in 2010 on her album Larva.

Music video 
A music video was made for the song, which Bush herself directed. It was inspired by Alfred Hitchcock's thriller film The 39 Steps (1935) and a Hitchcock lookalike also features in the video (a nod to the director's famous cameo appearances in his movies).

Track listings 
All songs written and composed by Kate Bush, except "The Handsome Cabin Boy", which is a traditional composition. "Alternative Hounds of Love" is not a remix, but an early version, with slightly different lyrics.

7-inch single (UK)

7-inch single (US)

12-inch single (UK)

12-inch single (US)

Personnel
Kate Bush – vocals, Fairlight CMI
Stuart Elliott – drums
Charlie Morgan – drums
Jonathan Williams – cello

Charts

Certifications

The Futureheads version

"Hounds of Love" was covered by English post-punk band the Futureheads for their self-titled debut album and was released as a single in February 2005. The single peaked at No. 8 on the UK charts in its first week and was named Best Single of 2005 by NME. In October 2011, NME placed it at No. 89 on its list "150 Best Tracks of the Past 15 Years".

Music video
The music video for the Futureheads version was filmed at a public park in Los Angeles at night. Various dog breeds run around the band throughout the video. The video was finished by Sunrise.

Track listings
7-inch vinyl single

CD single No. 1

CD single No. 2

Charts

Weekly charts

Year-end charts

References

External links
 

Kate Bush songs
1986 singles
The Futureheads songs
2005 singles
Songs written by Kate Bush
1984 songs